Mohamed Maach (born 20 February 1958) is a Moroccan judoka. He competed in the men's half-middleweight event at the 1984 Summer Olympics.

References

1958 births
Living people
Moroccan male judoka
Olympic judoka of Morocco
Judoka at the 1984 Summer Olympics
Place of birth missing (living people)
20th-century Moroccan people